Guidimakan Keri Kafo is a commune in the Cercle of Kayes in the Kayes Region of south-western Mali, near the border of Senegal and Mauritania. The main town (chef-lieu) of the commune is Gakoura which lies on the north bank of the Senegal River. In 2009 the commune had a population of 13,647.

References

External links
.

Communes of Kayes Region